Dębina Zakrzowska  is a village in the administrative district of Gmina Wojnicz, within Tarnów County, Lesser Poland Voivodeship, in southern Poland.

References

See also 
 Monument to the Allies in Dębina Zakrzowska

Villages in Tarnów County